The Battle of Bembezi (1 November 1893) was an engagement of the First Matabele War, between the British South Africa Company and the Ndebele Kingdom.

Battle 

The Battle of Bembezi took place on 1 November 1893. This was the most decisive battle won by the British South Africa Company in the First Matabele War of 1893.

The British South Africa Company went over to Ndebele positions and were almost ambushed, yet due to command issues they went another way with Ndebele spearman waiting for them. Though thoroughly outnumbered, (10,000 men to 700), the BSAC Maxim guns proved superior to Ndebele numbers. After sustaining heavy losses, the Ndebele began to retreat. Roughly 2,500 Ndebele were killed by the time the gunfire was over.

After the stunning defeat, King Lobengula fled the battle; the end of the First Matabele War was near.

Memorial 
A memorial was erected by the National Museums and Monuments of Zimbabwe in 1961. The monument contains a plaque in both English and Ndebele reading:

Music 
John Edmond wrote the song Battle of Bembezi in 1979 about the events of the battle.

References

Sources

1893 in Matabeleland
Wars involving the states and peoples of Africa
Conflicts in 1893
November 1893 events
Bembezi